Fürstenrieder Straße 257 is a small residential and commercial building in Munich. It is registered as a historical building in the Bayerische Denkmalliste.

Description 
The house is located in the Munich district Sendling-Westpark opposite the Waldfriedhof, slightly south of the intersection Fürstenrieder Straße / Waldfriedhofstraße. It was built in 1927 by Wilhelm Born and served as a workshop and office for the Munich gravestone sculptor Georg Halbich, who also owned the neighbouring property at Fürstenrieder Straße 255.

The building is an elongated one-storey building with a flat saddle roof. The central part is raised like a pavilion and carries a tent roof. The narrow side on Fürstenrieder Straße has a classifying façade with a wide triangular gable. The entrance door is flanked by two Doric columns.

References 

Buildings and structures in Munich
Historicist architecture in Munich
Buildings and structures completed in 1919